Janelle Ann Caren Quintana Manahan (born 26 July 1989) is an actress in the Philippines. She started showbusiness when she joined ABS-CBN's reality talent search Star Circle National Teen Quest as Janelle Manahan and made it to the top 6.

After her supporting stint in SCQ Reload and other ABS-CBN shows. Star Magic, her former Talent Agency decided to change her screen name to Janelle Quintana to avoid confusion about her non relationship with Star Magic's head, Mr. Johnny Manahan. She was later re-introduce as Janelle Quintana as one of the main lead in ABS-CBN's teen sitcom Let's Go.

She is now a Licensed Financial Adviser, Certified Investment Solicitor, Stock Trader and a member of the Million Dollar Round Table, MDRT is The Premier Association of Financial Professionals around the world. She started her career in the financial services industry in October 2013 with Philam Life.

Personal life 
Janelle was born in Albay to parents Maria Rosario Elvira Quintano Manahan and Julius Alejo Manahan who is a radio personality in their province (now work Zagitsit News FM Legazpi). Ever since she was a child, her parents noticed her love for dancing, acting and singing. She got influenced by her father who's in Media.

Her showbiz career started when she auditioned for Star Circle National Teen Quest, among the thousand to auditioned, she fortunately made it to Top 10, she was supposedly part of the FAB 5 (top 5) but due to wild card, Paw Diaz grabbed the spot and she finished her league to Top 6.

After SCQ, she has been seen in some ABS-CBN shows like SCQ Reload: Kilig Ako!, ASAP Fanatic and Vietnam Rose. Then she changed her screen name to Janelle Quintana and been seen in shows like Your Song, Maalaala Mo Kaya and Komiks, among others. She was best known for her role as the chubby chikadora named "Maffi" in ABS-CBN's sitcom Let's Go.

While busy taping for Let's Go, Janelle and Ram Revilla crossed paths and their relationship as boyfriend-girlfriend started. There are rumors that due to Ram's request, Janelle quit showbiz and left Let's Go's 3rd season as well. She declined her supposed big break for Anne Curtis and Zanjoe Marudo's starrer "The Wedding".

While away from showbiz, she was enrolled in De La Salle-College of Saint Benilde. Her unpublicized relationship with Ramgen lasted for five years and they were supposed to get married by 2013. Ramgen died on 28 October 2011. She miraculously survived the incident and is now the star witness to her deceased former boyfriend's case.

In January 2012, an intimate video of Janelle and Ramgen was leaked on the internet. Ramgen's brother, Senator Ramon Revilla Jr. has condemned the release of this video, much to his embarrassment as he was an author of an anti-voyeurism bill.

Career 

Quintana came into showbiz when she joined Star Circle National Teen Quest (as Janelle Manahan). Representing Albay, she made it to SCQ's Magic Circle of 10 and made it to Top 6.

Quintana is best known for her role as the chubby showbiz fanatic, Maffi in ABS-CBN's sitcom Let's Go. She was voted as one of the two most popular cast members of the sitcom alongside Mikel Campos.

Quintana was nominated as Best New Female Artist in the 19th Aliw Awards.  She was included in the It Girls and Boys section of 2008 Star Magic Catalog.

She was set to be part of the upcoming ABS-CBN teleserye "The Wedding" top billed by Zanjoe Marudo, Derek Ramsay & Anne Curtis, but she declined the offer due to her plan of finishing her studies. She was also rumored to be living in with boyfriend Ram Revilla.

Ram Revilla's murder

On the night of 28 October 2011 Janelle was in Bautista's house in Parañaque to accompany her former boyfriend Ram Revilla. According to her reply affidavit it was around 11PM when the crime was executed. It happened inside Ramgen's room.

She was first shot in her right shoulder followed by another gunshot on the left side of her face. When Ramgen and Ramona "Mara" Bautista, Ram's sister whose on the room as well saw she was shot, Ramgen immediately confronted the gun man whose wearing a Halloween mask. After the commotion with the killer, Ram was able to return inside the room and asked Ramona to lock the door. According to Janelle, Mara was panicking that time and didn't know what to do. Mara left the room and promised her to look for help but she didn't come back. By instinct, she used her mobile phone to send a message to her mom and some friends to seek for help. It didn't take a while before they were rescued both Janelle and Ramgen and was brought to the nearest hospital.

Janelle survived the incident but unfortunately Ramgen was pronounced dead on arrival.

Janelle was then transferred to the Asian Hospital in Muntinlupa where she was cured and received several facial surgeries. She found out Ramgen was dead a week after the crime. She stayed in Asian Hospital for more than a month and when she came out, she strongly prepared herself to fight for Ramgen's case. It was her boyfriend's sibling Ramon Joseph Bautista and Ramona Bautista who were accused of the crime. Investigation is currently on going.

Nomination 
Best New Female Artist (19th Aliw Awards)

Filmography

Film

Television

References

External links 
 
 Janelle Quintana
 Telebisyon
 Janelle Quintana @ Ktext Profiles

Filipino film actresses
1989 births
Star Circle Quest participants
Bicolano actors
Star Magic
People from Legazpi, Albay
Living people
Filipino television actresses